The resident commissioner of Puerto Rico is a non-voting member of the United States House of Representatives elected by the voters of the U.S. Commonwealth of Puerto Rico every four years, the only member of the House of Representatives who serves a four-year term. Because the Commissioner represents the entire U.S. territory irrespective of its population, and is not subject to congressional apportionment like those House members representing the 50 states, Puerto Rico's at-large congressional district is the largest congressional district by population in all of the United States.

Commissioners function in every respect as a member of Congress, including sponsoring legislation and serving on congressional committees, where they can vote on legislation, except that they are denied a vote on the final disposition of legislation on the House floor. They receive a salary of $174,000 per year and are identified as Member of Congress.

The current commissioner is Jenniffer González-Colón of the New Progressive Party (PNP), the first woman to hold the post. She is also affiliated with the Republican Party (R) at the national level.

Other U.S. territories have a similar representative position called a delegate.

History 
The United States Congress had seated non-voting "delegates" from various territories since 1794 as the country expanded across North America; these territories were all eventually admitted as states. The position of delegate was a legislative position with a two-year term, just like a member of Congress.

The United States acquired several overseas possessions as a result of the Spanish–American War. While the House of Representatives voted in 1900 for Puerto Rico to select a delegate, Congress instead devised a new form of territorial representative in the resident commissioner. United States Senator John Coit Spooner argued that granting a territory a delegate implied that it was on the path to statehood, which he asserted was not guaranteed for the new possessions acquired in the war, such as Puerto Rico and the Philippines. In fact, more than a century later, neither has become a state. (Puerto Rico remains a U.S. territory, while The Philippines became an independent republic in 1946.)

The original resident commissioner positions served a two-year term, though it was later extended to four years starting in 1920. The position also had executive responsibility in addition to legislative ones. The term had been used as to parts of the British Empire (see resident commissioner), but in an almost opposite sense; sent or recognized as the Crown's representative to manage a territory. In the American sense, resident commissioner always refers to a representative of a territory to the national government.

This representation has evolved over time. At first, the resident commissioner could not even be present on the floor of the House of Representatives; floor privileges were granted in 1902. In 1904, the officeholder gained the right to speak during debate and serve on the Committee on Insular Affairs, which had responsibility for the territories gained in the Spanish-American War.

In 1933, Resident Commissioner Santiago Iglesias was appointed to additional committees, and each of his successors has served on other committees also. But only in 1970 did the resident commissioner gain the right to vote in committees, gain seniority, or hold leadership positions.

The present-day resident commissioner, like the delegates from other territories and the District of Columbia, have almost all of the rights of other House members, including being able to sponsor bills and offer amendments and motions. Territorial representatives remain unable to vote on matters before the full House.

Summary of commissioners

List of resident commissioners pre-Constitution of the Commonwealth of Puerto Rico

Resident commissioners under the Constitution of the Commonwealth of Puerto Rico
 (6)
 (6)

US Party Affiliation

 (10)
 (2)

Recent elections

2000

2004

2008

2012

2016

2020

See also

 List of United States congressional districts
 Resident Commissioner of the Philippines

Notes

References

External links

1901 establishments in Puerto Rico
At-large United States congressional districts
At-large
Constituencies established in 1901
Resident Commissioner of Puerto Rico
resident commissioner
Political office-holders in Puerto Rico